The Ministry of Law and Human Rights is an Indonesian ministry that administers laws and human rights. It is responsible to the president, and is led by the Minister of Law and Human Rights, Yasonna Laoly, since 27 October 2014. The first minister was Soepomo.

History

Nomenclature
The Ministry of Law and Human Rights was established 19 August 1945 as the Department of Justice. In 2001-2004, this ministry was known as the Department of Law and Legislation. In 2004-2009, this ministry was known as the Department of Law and Human Rights. Since 2009, it has been known as Ministry of Justice and Human Rights.

Responsibility
The Department of Justice, as of 1945, was responsible in matters of court, jail, and attorneys. Its responsibilities were expanded to include the Attorney and Topography Agency in 1945. However, the Topography Agency was transferred to the Department of Defense in 1946. The creation of the Department of Religious Affairs resulted in transferring the Islamic High Court to a new department on 3 January 1946. Since 22 July 1960, the office Attorney General is elevated into a position that equal to a ministerial office.  hus, Attorney is independent to Minister of Justice since then. Transfer of General Court and State Administration Court to Supreme Court is started from 1999 and finished on 31 March 1999. Thus, the Ministry has different responsibility.

Organization
Based on Presidential Regulation No. 44/2015, as well as Ministerial Regulation No. 41/2021 on the Ministry Organization and Administration, the Ministry of Law and Human Rights is organized into the following:

Leadership elements 
 Office of the Minister of Law and Human Rights
 Office of the Deputy Minister of Law and Human Rights

Secretariat 
 Secretariat General headed by a Secretary General, tasked with coordinating duties, guidance, and administrative support provision for all units within the Ministry. The Secretariat General oversees several units, which follow:
 Bureau of Planning;
 Bureau of Human Resource;
 Bureau of Finance;
 Bureau of State-owned Property Management;
 Bureau of Public Relations, Law, and Cooperation; and
 Bureau of General Affairs.

Directorates-General 
 Directorate General of Legislation, tasked with legislation drafting and legislation policy development. It is subdivided into several units, as follow:
 DG Secretariat;
 Directorate of Legislation Drafting;
 Directorate of Legislation Harmonization I;
 Directorate of Legislation Harmonization II;
 Directorate of Regional Legislation Facilitation and Legislation Drafter Management;
 Directorate of Legislation Enactment, Translation, and Publication; and
 Directorate of Legislation Litigation.
 Directorate General of General Legal Administration, tasked with policy making and execution in matters relating to general administration of law. It is subdivided into several units, as follow:
 DG Secretariat;
 Directorate of Private Law;
 Directorate of Criminal Law;
 Directorate of Constitutional Law;
 Directorate of Central Authority and International Law; and
 Directorate of Information Technology.
 Directorate General of Correction, tasked with policy making and execution in matters relating to criminal corrections. It is subdivided into several units, as follow:
 DG Secretariat;
 Directorate of Detainee Management, Confiscated Object Management, and State Booties;
 Directorate of Inmate Management and Inmate Productiveness Training;
 Directorate of Correctional Guidance and Alleviation of Minors;
 Directorate of Security and Order;
 Directorate of Healthcare and Rehabilitation; and
 Directorate of Information Technology and Cooperation.
 Directorate General of Immigration, tasked with policy making and execution on matters relating to immigration. It is subdivided into several units, as follow:
 DG Secretariat;
 Directorate of Immigration Traffic;
 Directorate of Immigration Residence Permit;
 Directorate of Immigration Intelligence;
 Directorate of Immigration Supervision and Enforcement;
 Directorate of Immigration Cooperation; and
 Directorate of Immigration Information System and Technology.
 Directorate General of Intellectual Property, tasked with policy making and execution on matters relating to intellectual property rights management. It is subdivided into several units, as follow:
 DG Secretariat;
 Directorate of Copyrights and Industrial Designs;
 Directorate of Patents, Layout Designs of Integrated Circuit, and Trade Secrets;
 Directorate of Trademarks and Geographical Indications;
 Directorate of Intellectual Property Cooperation and Empowerment;
 Directorate of Intellectual Property Information Technology; and
 Directorate of Intellectual Property Investigation and Dispute Settlement.
 Directorate General of Human Rights, tasked with policy making and execution on matters relating to human rights. It is subdivided into several units, as follow:
 DG Secretariat;
 Directorate of Public Communication Service;
 Directorate of Human Rights Cooperation;
 Directorate of Human Rights Dissemination and Empowerment;
 Directorate of Human Rights Instrument; and
 Directorate of Human Rights Facilitation and Information.

Inspectorate 
 Inspectorate General is headed by an Inspector General, and tasked with implementing internal monitoring within the Ministry. The Inspectorate General oversees several units, as follow:
 IG Secretariat;
 Regional Inspectorate I;
 Regional Inspectorate II;
 Regional Inspectorate III;
 Regional Inspectorate IV;
 Regional Inspectorate V; and
 Regional Inspectorate VI.

Agencies 

 National Law Development Agency, which consists of several units:
 Agency Secretariat;
 Center for National Law Planning;
 Center for National Law Analysis and Evaluation;
 Center for National Law Documentation and Information Network; and
 Center for Legal Counselling and Aid.
 Agency for Research and Development of Law and Human Rights, which consists of several units:
 Agency Secretariat;
 Center for Research and Development of Law;
 Center for Research and Development of Human Rights;
 Center for Policy Research and Development; and
 Center for Law and Human Rights Research Data and Information Management.
 Human Resource Development Agency, which consists of several units:
 Agency Secretariat;
 Center for Development, Technical Training and Leadership;
 Center for Functionary Training and Human Rights; and
 Center for Competence Evaluation.

Advisors 
The Advisory Staff to the Minister directly advises the Minister on various strategic matters. Their work coordination are conducted by the Secretary General.
 Advisor to the Minister on Political and Security Affairs;
 Advisor to the Minister on Economic Affairs;
 Advisor to the Minister on Social Affairs;
 Advisor to the Minister on Inter-institutional Relations; and
 Advisor to the Minister on for Bureaucratic Reform Reinforcement.

Centers 

 Data and Information Technology Center provides technical data and IT support for the entire Ministry.

References

See also

Law and Human Rights
Indonesia
Indonesia
Indonesia